The HIF-1α internal ribosome entry site (IRES) is an RNA element present in the 5' UTR of the mRNA of HIF-1α that allows cap-independent translation. The HIF-1α internal ribosome entry site (IRES) allows translation to be maintained under hypoxic cell conditions that inhibit cap-dependent translation [1]. The hypoxia-inducible factor-1α protein (HIF-1α) is a subunit of the HIF-1 transcription factor, which induces transcription of several genes involved in the cellular response to hypoxia.

References

Further reading

External links 
 

Cis-regulatory RNA elements